Oltremare is a ballet by Mauro Bigonzetti to Bruno Moretti's eponymous music commissioned by New York City Ballet. The premiere took place Wednesday, January 23, 2008, at the New York State Theater, Lincoln Center, with costumes by the choreographer and Marc Happel and lighting by Mark Stanley. Oltremare is the third of three Bigonzetti / Moretti ballets commissioned by City Ballet, the others being Vespro and In Vento.

Original cast 

Maria Kowroski 
Tiler Peck
Tyler Angle 
Amar Ramasar

References 
Repertory Week, New York City Ballet, Spring Season, 2008 repertory, week 5
Playbill, New York City Ballet, Thursday, May 29

Reviews 
NY Times review by Alastair Macaulay, January 25, 2008
NY Post review by Clive Barnes, January 25, 2008
NY Sun review by Joel Lobenthal, January 25, 2008

Ballets by Mauro Bigonzetti
New York City Ballet repertory
2008 ballet premieres
Ballets by Bruno Moretti
Ballets designed by Marc Happel